United Arab Emirates competed at the 2020 Summer Olympics in Tokyo. Originally scheduled to take place during the summer of 2020, the Games were  postponed to 23 July to 8 August 2021, due to the COVID-19 pandemic. This was the nation's tenth consecutive appearance at the Summer Olympics.

Competitors
The following is a list of the number of competitors in the Games.

Athletics

United Arab Emirates received universality slots from the World Athletics to send a male track and field athlete to the Olympics.

Track & road events

Judo
 
United Arab Emirates entered two male judoka into the Olympic tournament based on the International Judo Federation Olympics Individual Ranking.

Shooting

United Arab Emirates entered one shooter at the games, after getting the allocation quotas.

Swimming

United Arab Emirates received a universality invitation from FINA to send a male top-ranked swimmer in his respective individual events to the Olympics, based on the FINA Points System of June 28, 2021.

References

Olympics
Nations at the 2020 Summer Olympics
2020